AAC SpaceQuest (formerly SpaceQuest, Ltd.) is a spacecraft components and engineering company located in Fairfax, Virginia, which focuses on the operations of small satellites.

The company designs, develops, constructs, launches and operates microsatellites and spacecraft components. SpaceQuest qualifies its components for use in space by flying them on its own satellites.   They also operate a fleet of low earth orbiting satellites, which are used for remote monitoring as well as tracking the location and status of large vessels at sea.

SpaceQuest's customers include US and foreign universities, NASA, the US Air Force, the Canadian Space Agency, commercial aerospace companies, and foreign developers of microsatellites.  Some of their projects include:

 FalconSAT 3 & 5, satellites developed by cadets at the U.S. Air Force Academy.
 AprizeSat 1, 2, 3, 4, 5, 8, 9, 10 commercial communications satellites for SpaceQuest
 ExactView 6,7
 AO-51, amateur radio satellite.
 Genesis I and Genesis II, inflatable space habitats Bigelow Aerospace.
 Thea and Brio, launched in December 2018 on Spaceflight's SSO-A mission, a pair of 3U cubesats hosting experimental payloads for commercial customers.

On October 15th 2020, AAC Clyde Space announced that an agreement had been reached to acquire all shares in SpaceQuest Ltd. The acquisition was completed in December 2020.

Satellite constellation 
SpaceQuest's AprizeSat satellites carry AIS (automatic identification system) receivers that can identify navigation signals broadcast by oceangoing vessels.   Since all of the AprizeSats have been launched on Dnepr rockets into polar orbits, the AIS data they collect over the poles can be used by companies like Orbcomm to complement the AIS data gathered nearer the equator by the lower-inclination orbits of the OG2 constellation.

In 2017, Spacequest began development on a new series of commercial small satellites based on the cubesat standard.  Thea and Brio contain a mix of in-house Spacequest-designed components, and commercial cubesat components provided by Gomspace.  On December 3, 2018, these satellites were launched via Falcon 9 into a sun-synchronous polar orbit.  Thea's primary mission is to evaluate an experimental spectrum survey payload developed by Aurora Insight, while Brio serves as the first satellite in a planned constellation from Australia-based startup Myriota.  Both Thea and Brio also contain AIS receivers.

References

External links 
 SpaceQuest website

Amateur radio companies
Companies based in Fairfax, Virginia
American companies established in 1994
Spacecraft manufacturers